Richard Holmes (earlier spelled Richard Homes) (b. 1704) was a founding settler of Norwalk, Connecticut.

Holmes was born about 1633, in York, England, the son of Francis Holmes and his first wife, whose name is unknown. Francis married a woman named Ann, and came to America with her prior to 1634. They originally settled in Watertown, Massachusetts. In 1636, Francis and Ann moved from Watertown to Wethersfield, Connecticut Colony. In 1657, Francis and Ann with their four children moved from Wethersfield to Stamford, Connecticut. He was one of the earliest settlers in Stamford.

Richard Holmes bought his Norwalk lot on 12 October 1657, from Alexander Bryan of Milford. He was the settlement's blacksmith. He also built the settlement's first saw mill on the Five Mile River.

He is listed on the Founders Stone bearing the names of the founding settlers of Norwalk in the East Norwalk Historical Cemetery.

References 

1633 births
1704 deaths
American blacksmiths
American Puritans
Founding settlers of Norwalk, Connecticut
People from York